Ambulantactus is a genus of hubbardiid short-tailed whipscorpions, first described by Monjaraz-Ruedas, Prendini & Francke in 2019. The species of this genus can be identified by their pedipalps.

Species 
, the World Schizomida Catalog accepts the following three species:

 Ambulantactus aquismon Monjaraz-Ruedas, Prendini & Francke, 2019 – Mexico
 Ambulantactus davisi (Gertsch, 1940) – Mexico
 Ambulantactus montielae Monjaraz-Ruedas, Prendini & Francke, 2019 – Mexico

References 

Schizomida genera